Laxman Chettri (born 26 January 1992) is an Indian cricketer. He made his first-class debut for Meghalaya in the 2018–19 Ranji Trophy on 20 December 2018.

References

External links
 

1992 births
Living people
Indian cricketers
Meghalaya cricketers
Place of birth missing (living people)